The 5th Annual Tony Awards were held on March 25, 1951, at the Waldorf-Astoria Grand Ballroom and broadcast on radio station WOR and the Mutual Network. The Master of Ceremonies was James Sauter and the presenters were Mrs. Martin Beck and Ilka Chase.

Performers: Barbara Ashley, Arthur Blake, Eugene Conley, Nancy Donovan, Joan Edwards, Dorothy Greener, Juanita Hall, Celeste Holm, Lois Hunt, Anne Jeffreys, Lucy Monroe, Herb Shriner.

Music was by Meyer Davis and his Orchestra.

Award winners 
Source:Infoplease

Nominees are not shown

Production

Performance

Craft

Special Award
Ruth Green, for her services as a volunteer in arranging reservation and seating for the five Tony Awards.

Multiple nominations and awards

The following productions received multiple awards.

5 wins: Guys and Dolls
4 wins: The Rose Tattoo
3 wins: Call Me Madam
2 wins: The Country Girl

References

External links
Official Site

Tony Awards ceremonies
1951 in theatre
1951 awards
1951 in New York City